The first USS Mustang (SP-36) was an armed yacht that served in the United States Navy as a patrol vessel from 1917 to 1919.

Mustang was a wooden-hulled, gasoline-powered yacht built in 1911 by National Boat and Electric Company at St. Joseph, Michigan.  The U.S. Navy purchased Mustang from her owner, Henry S. Beardsley of New York City, on 6 July 1917 for World War I service. She was commissioned as USS Mustang (SP-36) on 2 October 1917.

Assigned to the 3rd Naval District, Mustang operated out of Section Base No. 7 at Whitestone on Long Island, New York, for the remainder of World War I.  She patrolled the western reaches of Long Island Sound and the approaches to the East River.

At some point following the Armistice that ended the war on 11 November 1918, Mustang was decommissioned.  Stricken from the Navy List in June 1919, she was sold to Allen N. Spooner & Son of New York City on 23 July 1919.

References

Department of the Navy: Naval Historical Center: Online Library of Selected Images: Civilian Ships: Mustang (American Motor Boat, 1911). Served as USS Mustang (SP-36) in 1917-1919
NavSource Online: Section Patrol Craft Photo Archive Mustang (SP 36)

Patrol vessels of the United States Navy
World War I patrol vessels of the United States
Ships built in Michigan
Individual yachts
1911 ships